Mill River Provincial Park was a provincial park in Prince Edward Island, Canada. It is now owned and operated by Don MacDougall along with the Mill River resort and golf course.

References

Provincial parks of Prince Edward Island
Parks in Prince County, Prince Edward Island